Garba Nadama (1938 – 4 May 2020) was a Nigerian politician who was the second civilian governor of Sokoto State, Nigeria, in the short-lived Nigerian Second Republic, holding office from January 1982 to November 1983. He succeeded Shehu Kangiwa, who had died in a polo accident.

Biography 
Garba Nadama obtained a Ph.D. in history from Ahmadu Bello University in 1977.

Nadama was a fierce rival of Alhaji Ibrahim Gusau for the National Party of Nigeria (NPN) nomination for Sokoto deputy governor in 1979. He was described as a quiet, urbane and principled conservative politician.
In July 1982 Sokoto State received a N96 million loan from the World Bank. In December 1982, the Federal government provided N400,000 to Sokoto State to use in reducing gully erosion. Nadama described the amount as meager and insufficient to handle the problem. On 8 March 1993 he commissioned a new transmitter for the Nigerian Television Authority in Gusau. The Federal Polytechnic, Kaura-Namoda (now in Zamfara State) was established during his tenure.

Nadama left office after the 1983 military coup in which Major General Muhammadu Buhari took power.

Nadama became a member of the National Political Reform Council, and later became a prominent member of People's Democratic Party (PDP). Nadama became a director of Societe Generale Bank Nigeria (SGBN). In April 2008, he was deputy National Secretary of a committee to review recommendations for resolving internal differences in the PDP.

Nadama died on 4 May 2020 from COVID-19 and is survived by four wives and eighteen children.

References

1938 births
2020 deaths
Nigerian Muslims
Governors of Sokoto State
National Party of Nigeria politicians
Members of the Peoples Democratic Party (Nigeria)
Ahmadu Bello University alumni
Deaths from the COVID-19 pandemic in Nigeria